= Rothmanhaus =

The Rothmanhaus is a hotel in Naumburg, Germany that faces the Saale River. It became well-known in 1992 when popular German ice hockey player Leopold Nosske jumped off of a balcony on the fourth floor of the hotel.

== History ==
The Rothmanhaus started construction in 1907 primarily to serve travelers from Magdeburg. It was completed on June 4, 1910. The hotel's original founder and owner, Otto Rothman, constructed the hotel with a team of only 9 men, including himself. Otto died in 1920 of heart disease and passed ownership of the hotel to his son, Elias. Elias, 19 at the time, operated the hotel from 1920 to 1972, when he retired and gave ownership to his cousin, Irina. She still owns the hotel today.

=== Leopold Nosske suicide ===
Wildly popular hockey player Leopold Nosske checked into the hotel on November 9, 1992. He told a bellboy that he was visiting family in the area. The next day, Nosske was found dead at the back side of the hotel by a garbage collector. His autopsy stated that vodka and cocaine were found inside his system at the time of his death.
